The Laguna Melincué is an endorheic lake located in the province of Santa Fe, Argentina, in the General López Department, next to the town of Melincué, at approximately . It covers a surface area of about 120 km², and its top water level lies at around 86 m above mean sea level (c. 2003).

The lake forms part of a wetland ecosystem, noted for its large population of waterfowl and other birds, which is protected as a nature reserve. In times of drought the lake's waters became saline. In 2008 an area of 920 km² has been listed as a Wetland of International Importance under the Ramsar convention.

For decades the water level of the Melincué Lake have varied considerably, often flooding parts of its basin, and over time this has seriously affected the prosperity of the nearby towns and the maintenance of roads around it. According to a study by the Faculty of Engineering of the Universidad Nacional de Rosario, in 1968 the top water level stood at 82.5 m AMSL, more than 3 m below its current height. In 1998–2000 the provincial government passed legislation creating a Strategic Environmental Planning Area covering the surrounding districts (Melincué, Carreras, Hughes, Elortondo and Labordeboy) with the goal of promoting its sustainable development, but major concrete actions have failed to materialize.

References

 Government of Santa Fe. Law 11634 — Área de Planificación Estratégica Ambiental y Reserva Natural del Humedal de la Laguna de Melincué.
 El Santafesino. Aves y naturaleza protegidas.
 Wetlands International. Los Humedales de América del Sur, Chapter 12, Las Pampas.
 Universidad Nacional de Rosario, Faculty of Exact Sciences, Engineering and Surveying.  Propuesta para la planificación del manejo sustentable de la cuencia hidrográfica y de aporte directo de la Laguna Melincué.
  Fundación del Gran Rosario & ECOSUR. Laguna Melincué Natural Reserve

Lakes of Argentina
Endorheic lakes of South America
Ramsar sites in Argentina
Landforms of Santa Fe Province
Protected areas of Santa Fe Province